Ernst Theodor Wide (9 November 1888 – 8 April 1950) was a Swedish runner. He competed at the 1912 Summer Olympics held in Stockholm in the 1500 m and 3000 m events, and finished in fifth and fourth place, respectively. His fourth finish earned him a silver medal with the Swedish team.

References

1888 births
1950 deaths
Swedish male long-distance runners
Olympic silver medalists for Sweden
Athletes (track and field) at the 1912 Summer Olympics
Olympic athletes of Sweden
Medalists at the 1912 Summer Olympics
Olympic silver medalists in athletics (track and field)
Athletes from Stockholm